Chambang is an  county and administrative sub-unit of  Kra Daadi district in the state of Arunachal Pradesh. Also it is one of the administrative sub-unit comprising the 18-Palin assembly constituency.

Connectivity
Chambang is accessible by two motorways, with two more in progress. One of the operational road is from New Palin via Dari whose foundation stone was laid by the then Arunachal Pradesh Chief Minister Dorjee Khandu in Chambang in  2007 and other one  from New Palin via Pania. The town has a helipad used only in rare circumstance.

Drainage System 
Chatey flows through Chello village
Peri flows through Rongte Rite village,
Patee flows through Sangchang village and
Kurung flows through several villages and clusters while flowing downstream and provides for daily household utilities, agriculture and fishing.

Notable People
Charu Tajuk (Director Printing, Government of Arunachal Pradesh)
Charu Nile   APCS
Charu Tayum (Joint Director, Transport, Government Of Arunachal Pradesh)
Charu Menia  Zilla Parishad Chairperson

Kra Daadi district